Ivan Kovalčik Mileševac (March 3, 1968 - March 30, 2017), Prijepolje, Yugoslavia, Serbia) was a Serbian icon and fresco painter - the Prime Master of the Serbian Orthodox Eparchy of Mileševa. At the initiative of the National Museums of Prijepolje and Belgrade headed by directors Slavoljub Pušica and Jefta Jeftović in reconstruction projects of Nemanjic's endowments, in collaboration with SANU and under the supervision of the Institute for Protection of Cultural Heritage of Kraljevo, with the blessing of Serbian Patriarch Pavle and by blessing of episcops (bishops) of the Eparchy (dioceses) of Mileševa, Vasilije Veinović and Filaret Mićević, painted a larger number of iconostasis for the Serbian Orthodox Church in churches and monasteries of the Eparchy of Mileševa. Since 2006. he has lived in Novi Sad, where within the rules of Church painting, works on making icons and frescoes in the Byzantine style.

Significant projects
in the Eparchy of Mileševa:
 1998 - Iconostasis for Monastery Davidovica, dedicated to the Baptism of the Lord - 13th century
 2002 - Iconostasis for Monastery Kumanica, dedicated to St. Archangel Gavrilo - 14th century
 2005 - Iconostasis for Monastery Dubnica, dedicated to the Holy Trinity - 14th century
 2012 - Iconostasis for Monastery Janja, devoted to the Righteous Joachim and Anne - 15th century

Works

References

1968 births
People from Prijepolje
Eastern Orthodox Christians from Serbia
20th-century Serbian people
20th-century Serbian painters
21st-century Serbian painters
21st-century Serbian male artists
Living people
Serbian male painters
20th-century Serbian male artists